IFK Jönköping was a sports club in Jönköping, Sweden, with a women's soccer team that played in the Swedish second division during the 1990s. and was established in 1989 out of IK Tord's women's soccer section.

The club won the women's Småland district championship in 1994, 1995 and 1997.

When the women's soccer team was dissolved before the 1997 season, the activity was transferred over to IFK Öxnehaga.

References

Sport in Jönköping
Association football clubs established in 1989
Sports clubs disestablished in 1998
Defunct football clubs in Sweden
1998 disestablishments in Sweden